Figure in a landscape is a 1945 painting by the Irish-born artist Francis Bacon. Based on a photograph of Eric Hall dozing on a seat in Hyde Park, also the basis of another painting, Figure in a landscape (1945), which was bought by Diana Watson and later in 1950 by the Tate Gallery (with the support of Graham Sutherland, then a trustee (1948–1954)).

Figure Study (1945) was destroyed; "Figure Study I2 and "Figure Study II" are from 1945 or 1946. Study for Man with Microphones (1946) was shown at the Lefevre Gallery, (British Painters Past and Present July–August 1946), and at the Anglo-French Art Centre, (Seventh Exhibition November – December 1946). Bacon was clearly unhappy with this picture: it was listed as an abandoned work in the 1964 catalogue raisonné, and was passed on to the Estate in 1992 as a slashed canvas.

At some point in 1947–1948, Bacon returned to make a second version, Study for Man with Microphones (1947–48) (shown February to March 1948, at the Museum of Modern Art, New York, Contemporary Painters (last (monochrome) plate in the catalogue by James Thrall Soby) as Study for Man with Microphones (1946); and from October to November 1962 in Francis Bacon at the Galleria d'Arte Galatea, Milan as Gorilla with Microphones (1945–46)).

References

Study for Crouching Nude, 1952
1945 paintings
Collection of the Tate galleries